Al-Madina FM ("The City FM") is a private Syrian radio station based in Damascus. It broadcasts a mix of Arabic music along with hit music.

History 
Al-Madina FM was launched in 2005, becoming the first Syrian private radio station. Before this, only government and clandestine stations were broadcast.

Broadcasting
With constant emphasis on various music, Madina FM has become one of the mainstream radio broadcasters of Syria. Al-Madina FM is known across the country and is a very popular radio station whose programs are full of music and playlists of energetic songs of popular Syrian singers.

References 

BBC - Pushing the boundaries of Syrian media (2010)

External links
Al-Madina FM website

Radio stations in Syria
Arabic-language radio stations